Opened in 1946, Cuyamaca Outdoor School, the first Outdoor School in California and the only Outdoor School in San Diego County that is certified by ROSS (Residential Outdoor Science Schools) and COSA (California Outdoor Schools Administration), is owned by San Diego County Office of Education and located in the Cuyamaca Rancho State Park and Cleveland National Forest in Descanso, California. During the school year students, generally 6th graders, come to learn subjects related to outdoor education, staying between four and five days. On campus there are several dormitory facilities, a dining hall, multipurpose room, activity building and infirmary. The construction of several new buildings on campus has been "certified gold" by the U.S. Green Building Council.

References

Public schools in California
Education in San Diego County, California
1946 establishments in California